Smolyachkovo is a municipal settlement in Kurortny District of the federal city of St. Petersburg, Russia, located on the Karelian Isthmus on the northern shore of the Gulf of Finland. Population:  

Before Winter War and Continuation War it was part of Finland in municipality of Terijoki.

References

Municipal settlements under jurisdiction of Saint Petersburg
Kurortny District
Karelian Isthmus